The  singles competition of the 2001 Britannic Asset Management International Championships was part of the 27th edition of the Eastbourne International tennis tournament, Tier II of the 2001 WTA Tour. Julie Halard-Decugis was the defending champion but did not compete that year. Lindsay Davenport won in the final 6–2, 6–0 against Magüi Serna.

Seeds
A champion seed is indicated in bold text while text in italics indicates the round in which that seed was eliminated. The top four seeds received a bye to the second round.

  Lindsay Davenport (champion)
  Nathalie Tauziat (second round)
  Amanda Coetzer (second round)
  Magdalena Maleeva (second round)
  Sandrine Testud (first round)
  Silvia Farina Elia (quarterfinals)
  Meghann Shaughnessy (quarterfinals)
  Conchita Martínez (second round)

Draw

Final

Section 1

Section 2

External links
 2001 Britannic Asset Management International Championships Draw

Britannic Asset Management International Championships
Singles